The Nazi Victims Memorial in Lund is located in  in Lund, Sweden. It was erected to honor the 26 Polish refugees who came to Sweden from Nazi concentration camps in Germany after the end of World War II and died shortly upon arrival. The memorial consists of a sculpture and a memorial plate.

The sculpture depicts an angel holding in his right hand a deceased dove with outstretched wings symbolizing the innocent victim who suffered martyrdom. From the left hand, a dove rises to the sky, symbolizing victory and freedom - the immortal and liberated soul of the deceased victim. The sculpture, created by the Hungarian-Swedish-Japanese artist Nándor Wagner, alludes to the Gospel of Mark 16:6 “Don't be alarmed. You are looking for Jesus the Nazarene, who was crucified. He has risen!”. In front of the sculpture is a marble plate with Poland's coat of arms, the White Eagle, with the text "To the victims of the concentration camps—Polish compatriots" engraved on the sides of the plate.

The memorial was unveiled on October 27, 1963.

References

1963 establishments in Sweden
Monuments and memorials in Lund
Lund
1963 sculptures